Lahloo was a British tea clipper known for winning the Tea Race of 1870, and finishing second in the Tea Race of 1871. She sailed from Fuzhou to London with over a million pounds (500 tons) of tea in 1868.

Construction
Lahloo was of the same class and sharpness as Ariel, "with more deadrise and tumblehome and a slightly fuller run".She was designed by William Steele, had a composite hull, and carried Cunningham's roller-reefing topsails.

Voyages
Fuzhou to London
101 days, 1868
101 days, 1869 (via the "Eastern Passage" out of the China Sea)
111 days, 1871
London to Shanghai
98 days (95 days pilot to pilot), 1869

Won the Tea Race of 1870
"The race of 1870 from Foo-chow to London was won by the Lahloo in 97 days, the other vessels being: the Windhover, 100 days; Sir Launcelot, 102 days; Leander, 103 days; Thermopylae, 106 days."

Finished second in the Tea Race of 1871

"In 1871 the Titania won in 93 days; the Lahloo, 111 days, from Foo-chow to London; and from Shanghai to London the Thermopylae was 106 days; Cutty Sark, 110 days, and Forward Ho, 118 days. This was about the last of the tea clipper racing, for the combined competition of steam and the Suez Canal proved too powerful for sail. No more tea clippers were built after 1869; by degrees these beautiful vessels were driven into other trades; and so the Clipper Ship Era drifted into history."

Sailing performance

According to Lubbock, the tea clippers Lahloo, Fiery Cross, Taeping and Serica  performed at their best in light breezes, as they were all rigged with single topsails. The photograph at the beginning of this article shows Lahloo rigged with double topsails. The photograph is believed to date from the early 1870sshe was built with single topsails and it is not clear when the change was made.

Loss of the ship

Lahloo was wrecked on Sandalwood Island, Sunda Islands, on 31 July 1872 whilst on a voyage from Shanghai to London with tea. Her crew survived.

Notes

References

Further reading

External links
Lahloo Tea, company founded by great-great granddaughter of a man who sailed on the ship
Description of the Tea Race of 1871
Lithograph of Lahloo
Betting on Lahloo for upcoming Tea Race
Account of 1868 Tea Race
Account of the wreck of Lahloo

Tea clippers
Individual sailing vessels
Victorian-era merchant ships of the United Kingdom
Ships built on the River Clyde
Vanua Levu
Shipwrecks in the Pacific Ocean
Maritime incidents in July 1872
1867 ships